Sir William Leman, 1st Baronet (died 1667) was an English politician who sat in the House of Commons  at various times between 1645 and 1660.

Leman was the son of William Leman of Beccles and his wife Alice.  He was a woollen draper and a member of the Worshipful Company of Fishmongers.  He was heir to his uncle,  Sir John Leman, Lord Mayor of London in 1617, and  purchased the manor of Northaw in Hertfordshire, from William Sidley. He was  High Sheriff of Hertfordshire in 1636 and High Sheriff of Huntingdonshire in 1641.

Leman was an alderman of the City of London and was involved with Cornelius Fish, the Chamberlain of London, in running a charity in Bassishaw Ward established in 1638.

In 1645, Leman was elected Member of Parliament for Hertford in the Long Parliament. He became an alderman of Bread Street ward in 1649. In 1651 he was a Councillor of State. He was chosen as alderman for Billingsgate ward on 12 July 1653. He resat as MP for Hertford in 1659 for the Restored Rump Parliament.

Leman was  created baronet on  3 March 1665.

Leman married Rebecca Prescot, daughter  of Edward Prescot, of Thoby, in Essex, and of London. He had a son, William.

References

Year of birth missing
1667 deaths
Baronets in the Baronetage of England
English MPs 1640–1648
English MPs 1648–1653
Aldermen of the City of London